Giridha is Maldivian comedy drama web series written and directed by Yoosuf Shafeeu. It stars Ibrahim Jihad, Ali Azim and Ali Usam in main roles. The film follows three friends who move to Male' in hopes of finding work and struggle to pay their rent. They befriend their leaser and plan on following their lifelong dream of working in the film industry. The pilot episode of the series was released on 7 September 2021.

Cast and characters

Main
 Ibrahim Jihad as Ibrahim Jinah
 Ali Azim as Ayaaz
 Ali Usam as Mafaaz

Recurring
 Aminath Noora as Madam Fathun
 Shima as Rosemeen
 Ahmed Ziya as Rameez 
 Mohamed Afrah as Zumarrath

Guest
 Ansham Mohamed as Rozy (Episode 4)
 Shana as Rozaina (Episode 7)
 Shifana as Roziana (Episode 8)
 Ahmed Easa as Vasanti (Episode 11)
 Mohamed Faisal as Director Sibzaud (Episode 13)
 Hussain Shibau as Boogle Master (Episode 15)

Episodes

Development
After the project was put in halt for several months, director Yoosuf Shafeeu resumed shooting of the film, following the positive feedback from Multi Screen. The series was developed as a mix of sitcom comedy and casual comedy. The project was re-announced on 7 August 2021, with several actors from Shafeeu's previous directorial venture, Avahteriyaa (2021).

Release and reception
The pilot episode of the series was made available for streaming on Baiskoafu on 7 September 2021, to positive reviews from critics.

References

Serial drama television series
Maldivian television shows
Maldivian web series